This is a list of countries within Europe which are not part of the European Pattern Committee. All of the following races are classified within of their respective racing district, with international races recognised in bold.

Austria

Belgium

The Open de Mons is run over an all-weather track at Mons.

Czech Republic

Hungary

Spain

References

 International flat races, 2015

Horse racing-related lists